Parliamentary elections were held in the Kingdom of Croatia-Slavonia from 6 to 9 November 1901.

Results

References

Elections in Croatia
Croatia
1901 in Croatia
Elections in Austria-Hungary
November 1901 events
Kingdom of Croatia-Slavonia
Election and referendum articles with incomplete results